Consequentia mirabilis (Latin for "admirable consequence"), also known as Clavius's Law, is used in traditional and classical logic to establish the truth of a proposition from the inconsistency of its negation. It is thus related to reductio ad absurdum, but it can prove a proposition using just its own negation and the concept of consistency. 
For a more concrete formulation, it states that if a proposition is a consequence of its negation, then it is true, for consistency. In formal notation:
.

Equivalent forms
.

History
Consequentia mirabilis was a pattern of argument popular in 17th-century Europe that first appeared in a fragment of Aristotle's Protrepticus: "If we ought to philosophise, then we ought to philosophise; and if we ought not to philosophise, then we ought to philosophise (i.e. in order to justify this view); in any case, therefore, we ought to philosophise."

Barnes claims in passing that the term consequentia mirabilis refers only to the inference of the proposition from the inconsistency of its negation, and that the term Lex Clavia (or Clavius' Law) refers to the inference of the proposition's negation from the inconsistency of the proposition.

See also
Ex falso quodlibet
Tertium non datur
Peirce's law

References

Theorems in propositional logic
Latin logical phrases